Acanthacorydalis is a genus of insects belonging to the family Corydalidae.

The species of this genus are found in Southeastern Asia.

Species:

Acanthacorydalis asiatica 
Acanthacorydalis fruhstorferi 
Acanthacorydalis horrenda 
Acanthacorydalis imperatrix 
Acanthacorydalis orientalis 
Acanthacorydalis sinensis 
Acanthacorydalis unimaculata 
Acanthacorydalis yunnanensis

References

Corydalidae
Insect genera